Yaël Braun-Pivet (born 7 December 1970) is a French lawyer and politician who has served as President of the French National Assembly since 28 June 2022. She is the first woman to hold this position. A member of Renaissance (RE), she was previously Minister of the Overseas under Prime Minister Élisabeth Borne in 2022. Braun-Pivet is currently serving as a member of the French National Assembly since 2017, representing the department of Yvelines.

Political career
Before entering politics, Braun-Pivet volunteered with Restaurants du Cœur, a French charity, the main activity of which is to distribute food packages and hot meals to those in need.

In parliament, Braun-Pivet chaired the Law Committee. As part of her work on the committee, she led the work on a 2017 law regulating conflict of interest among elected officials, which had been initiated as a consequence of the Fillon affair. From July 2018, she also chaired a parliamentary inquiry into the Benalla affair.

In September 2018, after François de Rugy's appointment to the government, Braun-Pivet announced her candidacy for the presidency of the National Assembly; she eventually withdrew and instead endorsed Richard Ferrand.

In February 2021, Braun-Pivet received the support of the entire National Assembly after being targeted by an email with anti-Semitic insults and threats; shortly after, the Paris prosecutor's office opened an investigation.

Political positions
In July 2019, Braun-Pivet voted in favor of the French ratification of the European Union's Comprehensive Economic and Trade Agreement (CETA) with Canada.

In 2021, Braun-Pivet proposed to create a new ad-hoc body to better supervise the government's decision-making process on the COVID-19 pandemic in France.

Also in 2021, Braun-Pivet voted against La République En Marche !'s party line and instead supported draft legislation proposed by the Liberties and Territories group aimed at legalizing assisted suicide.

Personal life
Braun-Pivet is married and has five children. Braun-Pivet is Jewish and attended a Jewish school in Strasbourg and earned a degree in Private law from Paris Nanterre University. Both her grandfathers exiled in France in the 1930s. One of them, who came from Poland, received a French Resistance Medal after World War II.

See also
 2017 French legislative election

References

|-

|-

1970 births
Living people
French people of Polish-Jewish descent
Deputies of the 15th National Assembly of the French Fifth Republic
French women lawyers
La République En Marche! politicians
21st-century French women politicians
Jewish French politicians
Politicians from Nancy, France
Women members of the National Assembly (France)
Deputies of the 16th National Assembly of the French Fifth Republic
French Ministers of Overseas France
Presidents of the National Assembly (France)
Women legislative speakers
20th-century French lawyers
Members of Parliament for Yvelines
Paris Nanterre University alumni